The women's singles tennis competition was one of five tennis events at the 1924 Summer Olympics. It was held from 13 to 20 July at the Stade Olympique Yves-du-Manoir. There were 31 competitors from 14 nations (after 7 withdrawals). The event was won by Helen Wills of the United States, the first American victory in the women's singles. Julie Vlasto of France took silver. Kathleen McKane Godfree of Great Britain repeated as bronze medalist.

Background

This was the fifth appearance of the women's singles tennis. A women's event was held only once during the first three Games (only men's tennis was played in 1896 and 1904), but has been held at every Olympics for which there was a tennis tournament since 1908. Tennis was not a medal sport from 1928 to 1984, though there were demonstration events in 1968 and 1984.

France's Suzanne Lenglen was the reigning Olympic champion and the dominant player of the time; however, she was ill (battling jaundice) and could not compete in front of the home crowd. American Helen Wills (who would go on to replace Lenglen as the dominant women's player and win 19 total singles Grand Slam titles) was 18 at the time and had played in three Grand Slam tournaments to date, reaching the finals in all three (and winning the 1923 U.S. championship). Julie Vlasto was the top French player in Lenglen's absence.

Greece, Hungary, India, Ireland, the Netherlands, and Spain each made their debut in the event. France and Great Britain each made their fourth appearance, tied for most among nations to that point.

Competition format

The competition was a single-elimination tournament with a bronze-medal match. All matches were best-of-three sets.

Schedule

Draw

Finals

Top half

Section 1

Section 2

Bottom half

Section 3

Section 4

References

Sources
 ITF, 2008 Olympic Tennis Event Media Guide

 

Women's singles
1924 in women's tennis
1924 in French women's sport
Ten